Diabolocatantops pinguis is a species of grasshoppers in the subfamily Catantopinae and tribe Catantopini.  This species can be found in the Indian subcontinent, China and Indo-China.  No subspecies are listed in the Catalogue of Life.

Gallery

References

External links 
 
 

Catantopinae
Orthoptera of Indo-China